Cyperus tacnensis is a species of sedge that is native to parts of South America.

See also 
 List of Cyperus species

References 

tacnensis
Plants described in 1834
Flora of Bolivia
Flora of Peru
Taxa named by Christian Gottfried Daniel Nees von Esenbeck
Taxa named by Franz Meyen